Dorypygidae is a family of trilobite belonging to the order Corynexochida.

Genera
 Atdabanella Repina 1965
 Basocephalus Ivshin 1952
 Bonnaria Lochman 1956
 Bonnia Walcott 1916
 Bonniella Resser 1937
 Bonnima Fritz 1991
 Bonniopsis Poulsen 1946
 Dorypygina Lermontova 1940
 Fordaspis Lochman 1956
 Kooteniella Lermontova 1940
 Mengzia Lo 1974
 Ogygopsis Walcott 1889
 Olenoides Meek 1877
 Protypus Walcott 1986
 Shipaiella Zhang et al. 1980
 Strettonia Cobbold 1931

References

 
Corynexochina
Trilobite families
Cambrian trilobites